Luis Javier Ordaz (born August 12, 1975), is a former Major League Baseball utility infielder and current hitting coach for the Potomac Nationals. Ordaz played for the St. Louis Cardinals (1997–1999), Kansas City Royals (2000–2002) and Tampa Bay Devil Rays (2006). He bats and throws right-handed.

In a six-season career, Ordaz posted a .219 hitter with 30 RBI and no home runs in 205 games played.

In 2013, Ordaz, was the hitting coach for the Class-A Auburn Doubledays.  In 2014, Ordaz became the hitting coach for the South Atlantic League Hagerstown Suns. In the 2018 season, he was the hitting coach for the Potomac Nationals (Class A - Advanced).

See also
 List of Major League Baseball players from Venezuela

External links

Venezuelan Professional Baseball League

1975 births
Águilas del Zulia players
Arkansas Travelers players
Charleston AlleyCats players
Charleston Wheelers players
Durham Bulls players
Indianapolis Indians players
Iowa Cubs players
Kansas City Royals players
Living people
Major League Baseball second basemen
Major League Baseball shortstops
Major League Baseball players from Venezuela
Memphis Redbirds players
Minor league baseball coaches
Navegantes del Magallanes players
Omaha Golden Spikes players
Omaha Royals players
Pastora de los Llanos players
Pastora de Occidente players
Sportspeople from Maracaibo
Petroleros de Cabimas players
Princeton Reds players
St. Louis Cardinals players
St. Petersburg Cardinals players
Syracuse Chiefs players
Tampa Bay Devil Rays players
Venezuelan expatriate baseball players in the United States